Bulat Zhamituly Utemuratov (also called Bolat, Bolat Jamıtuly Ótemuratov; born 13 November 1957) is a Kazakhstani businessman, public figure, diplomat and philanthropist.

In 1999, Utemuratov was a member of the United Nations Economic Commission for Europe.

He became the President of the Kazakhstan Tennis Federation  in 2007. Bulat Utemuratov is a vice-president and a board member of the International Tennis Federation (since September, 2019).

Public and charity activity

Tennis 
Under his initiatives and in the frame of his mandate of President of the Kazakhstan Tennis Federation, Bulat Utemuratov developed various charity associations to promote tennis for Kazakh youth. He directed the formation of a Tennis Academy known as "Team Kazakhstan"  which was created to train promising players of the national tennis team in 2007. He has invested US$200 million to develop the sport in various ways such as establishing the country's national teams, developing children's tennis, and constructing tennis infrastructure in all major cities of Kazakhstan. Since 2010, Kazakhstan is regularly ranked among the world's top tennis nations.

In September 2015, Utemuratov became a board member of the International Tennis Federation. In 2017, the International Tennis Federation and Asian Tennis Federation awarded Bulat Utemuratov the transcendent merit in the development of tennis in the region.

In September 2019, Bulat Utemuratov was re-elected as ITF Board member and appointed ITF Vice President.  In October, 2019 Kazakhstan Tennis Federation held a charity exhibition match with participation of Rafael Nadal and Novac Djokovic in Nur-Sultan.

On 9 July 2022, Elena Rybakina became the first Kazakh to win the Ladies Singles tennis championship at Wimbledon. Rybakina thanked Utemuratov for his role as head of the Kazakh tennis federation in a press conference after her win.

In October 2022, Kazakhstan hosted its first ever ATP 500 tournament in Astana. Competitors included world # 1 Carlos Alcaraz, along with Medvedev, Tsitsipas, Djokovic and Rublev.

Bulat Utemuratov Foundation 
In February 2014 The Bulat Utemuratov Charity Foundation was created  with Bulat Utemuratov as a member of the Board of Trustees. The foundation's mission is to promote health, education and culture development.

The foundations supports different programs such as:

 Program for children under 15 years of age with autism spectrum disorder and their families. Under this program, eight centers for children with autism spectrum disorder were opened in eight cities of Kazakhstan: Nur-Sultan, Almaty, Ust-Kamenogorsk, Kyzylorda, Aktobe, Uralsk, Shymkent, Petropavlovsk and Taraz.
 Balameken project for providing accommodation for those most in need. The Bulat Utemuratov Foundation built houses for 100 low-income families in Kyzylorda. The cost of project implementation made KZT 450 million.
 Support of Red Crescent initiatives in Kazakhstan.
 Burabike Fest -  Burabike Fest is a fundraising festival which was founded in 2013. The event consists of professional and amateur cycling events, musical performances and charity auctions to raise money for medical services. The most recent Burabike Fest was held in 2019.
 Reconstruction of the Botanical Garden of Almaty, which President Tokayev visited on 12 May 2020 shortly before the garden was opened for the public.

In March 2020, the Bulat Utemuratov Foundation allocated KZT 200 million to combat COVID-19 in the cities of Nur-Sultan and Almaty. 94,000 COVID-19 rapid testing kits were provided by the Bulat Utemuratov Foundation to the health departments of Nur-Sultan and Almaty.

Bulat Utemuratov announced his decision to allocate one million USD through Verny Capital Group of Companies to Birgemiz Relief Fund, created at the initiative of Nursultan Nazarbayev, the first President of the Republic of Kazakhstan. The Fund acquired two  laboratory complexes for PCR tests for the detection of COVID-19 for US$4 million. The laboratory complexes will be installed in Nur-Sultan and Almaty, and they can be quickly relocated and deployed in other cities.

In May 2020, the businessman allocated US$6 million for the construction of 150 new homes for flood-affected residents of the Makhtaaral district of Turkestan region.

In 2021 Bulat Utemuratov Foundation launched two new projects - Green Schools Project and Young Leaders Academy. 16 schools of Almaty were equipped with greenhouses within the Green Schools Project. Over 15, 000 school children of Turkestan and Shymkent cities are participating in Young Leaders Academy project.

Other 
Bulat Utemuratov is the chairman of the Board of Trustees of the Fund for Ballet and National Dance Development and Support. He also supports Fund of Kazakhstan musician Batyrkhan Shukenov, which finances the republican competition of wooden and brass wind instruments and scholarships for students of the National Conservatory. Regular exhibitions of Kulanshi Center for Contemporary Art are held under his patronage at Forte Bank Kulanshi Art Space.

Bulat Utemuratov is the sole shareholder in Narxoz University.

Another charity educational project in Kazakhstan is Haileybury Kazakhstan.

Business 
In 1995, Utemuratov, jointly with a group of partners, founded the Almaty Trade and Finance (ATF) Bank, and by 2007 was its controlling shareholder. During this time, ATF Bank grew from a small financial institution to a large group and one of the leaders of the banking sector in Kazakhstan. In 2007, Bulat Utemuratov, along with minority shareholders, sold ATF Bank to the Italian UniCredit group for $2.3 billion. This transaction became the largest in the Central Independent States (CIS) banking sector as of 2007.  Subsequent reports suggested that Utemuratov's stake in ATF had been larger than previously known and that he and family members made more than $1 billion from the sale.

After the 2009 crisis, the following banks were created: Kassa Nova, the first microcredit bank in Kazakhstan and ForteBank, a business bank. In May 2014, Samruk-Kazyna SWF closed a sale of its shares in Temirbank and part of its shares in Aliance Bank to businessman Bulat Utemuratov.

Bulat Utemuratov is a key investor  of the projects managed by Verny Capital investment group, together with VEON he also owns two telecommunications operators –"KarTel" in Kazakhstan and "SkyMobile" in Kyrgyzstan operating under the brand: Beeline.
In October 2019, Bulat Utemuratov was in the top three of Forbes list of the 50 richest businessmen of Kazakhstan with an estimated capital of US$3,4 billion.

On 1 December 2020, The Wall Street Journal reported about  the freezing of Bulat Utemuratov's assets including stakes in luxury hotels, cash in bank accounts in half a dozen countries and a Burger King franchise, by a UK civil court on the claim of BTA Bank.  According to a statement distributed by Verny Capital on 9 December 2020, the freezing injunction of the English Court in relation to the assets of Bulat Utemuratov had been revoked following a settlement between the two parties .

President Nazarbayev 
After Kazakhstan became an independent country in 1991, President Nursultan Nazarbayev selected Utemuratov to go to Vienna and find economic opportunities for the new republic.
After Utemuratov returned, he stayed close to President Nazarbayev and held several senior roles in the Kazakh government, including secretary of the security council from 2003 to 2006 and head of the presidential property management directorate from 2006 to 2008.

From 2008 to 2013, he was described as an "adviser to the president" and he also held a role as a special representative to Kyrgyzstan.

This close relationship with Nazarbayev led to Utemuratov being given the nickname "the grey cardinal" in Kazakhstan.

Dame Margaret Hodge, a British Member of Parliament, named Bulat Utemuratov in a speech she made in March 2022 about corruption in Kazakhstan. Utemuratov was one of 30 oligarchs and members of the Kazakh elite who, Hodge claimed, had benefited from their ties to the Nazarbayev regime. Hodge said: “Bulat Utemuratov is a former chief of staff to Nazarbayev. A US diplomatic cable reported allegations that Utemuratov was the president’s "personal financial manager" and his own website assesses his personal wealth at $3.9 billion.”

Glencore 
Glencore, the Swiss-based mining and commodities company, acquired the Vasilkovskoye gold mine in Kazakhstan from Verny Capital. As part of this transaction, Verny was given shares in Kazzinc, Glencore's copper subsidiary in Kazakhstan.
When Glencore announced its initial public offering (IPO) in London in 2011, the company said that some of the proceeds would be used to buy back the Kazzinc shares held by Verny Capital.

In 2012, Glencore bought the Kazzinc shares back from Verny Capital for $1.359 billion, including $400 million in cash and the rest in Glencore shares.
Since that transaction, Utemuratov and Glencore have done several other deals together. 
In 2015, Glencore bought Utemuratov's Gulfstream private jet in an undisclosed transaction.

In 2012, Glencore's Kazzinc subsidiary bought a 56% in a private school called Haileybury Astana for $23 million.

The Times quoted a spokeswoman for Utemuratov saying he: "is neither a middleman, nor proxy for President Nazarbayev" and that he had not profited from his relationship with the President.

In 2013, Glencore gave a loan to Astana Property Management (APM), a company owned by Bulat Utemuratov via Verny Capital. The loan was to finance APM's construction of the Talan Towers hotel and apartment complex in Astana, Kazakhstan. Glencore loaned a total of $237 million to the project but the miner was forced to write off $96.5 million in 2018 after reported poor performance.

Awards

 Order of Kurmet  (2002)
 Honorary citizen of Kyzylorda Region
Zhomart Zhurek Award (2018) for opening Asyl Miras autism-center in Uralsk and a joint project with the Red Crescent Society to support the population of East Kazakshstan Oblast affected by floods.

In 2016, Bulat Utemuratov was chosen as one of the nominees in the "Business" category of the national project «El Tulgasy» (Leader of the Motherland) The idea of the project was to select the most significant citizens of Kazakhstan whose names are now associated with the achievements of the country. More than 350,000 people voted in this project, and Utemuratov was voted into 7th place in his category.

Personal life
Utemuratov is married to Utemuratova (Baishuakova) Azhar Abzhamiyevna.

He has two sons, Alidar Utemuratov (born in 1979) and Anuar Utemuratov (born in 1983), and a daughter, Dinara (born in 2003).

References 

1957 births
Living people
Kazakhstani businesspeople
Ethnic Kazakh people
Recipients of the Order of Kurmet